State Road 262 (NM 262) is a  state highway in the US state of New Mexico. NM 262's western terminus is at NM 206 and the eastern terminus of NM 258 in Milnesand, and the eastern terminus is a continuation as Farm to Market Road 2182 (FM 2182) at the Texas/ New Mexico border.

Major intersections

See also

References

262
Transportation in Roosevelt County, New Mexico